Sam's Game was a celebrity poker program on Playboy TV. It featured a lineup of comedians, Playmates, and professional Texas Hold 'Em players and was hosted by Simpsons' co-developer, Sam Simon.

Format
Shot at Hugh Hefner's private sky villa at the Palms Resort, the show featured celebrities playing traditional Texas Hold 'Em with their own actual money, as opposed to charity contributions.

Women in Playboy bunny costumes served as the card dealers and cocktail waitresses. A variety of comedians, actresses, professional card players, and ex-Playmates made up the rotating table of players, with Sam Simon being the only constant.

Featured players
Norm Macdonald
Artie Lange
Brande Roderick
Dave Attell
Jennifer Tilly
Jeff Ross
Deanna Brooks
Andrea Lowell
Phil Laak
Jay Kogen

References

External links
Official Website

2009 American television series debuts
2009 American television series endings
Television series by Alta Loma Entertainment
Television series by Playboy Enterprises
Playboy TV original programming
Television shows set in the Las Vegas Valley